= International Day of Action for Rivers =

International observance, 14 March

- Official name: International Day of Action for Rivers
- Observed by: Worldwide
- Type: International
- Date: March 14
- Next time: 14 March 2027
- Frequency: Annual
- First time: 1998
- Related to: Rivers, Water conservation, Environmental movement

International Day of Action for Rivers is observed every year on March 14, which falls on a Sunday in some years. The day is also referred to as the International Day for Actions Against Dams and for Rivers, Water, and Life. Since 1998, this day has been observed globally. The decision to commemorate this day was made at an international assembly held in Curitiba, Brazil, in March 1997. The aim was to remind people of their duties and responsibilities towards rivers, and what actions are necessary to protect them.

In Bangladesh, the organization Green Voice has been working since its inception to raise awareness about rivers. They promote the slogan "Save rivers to save the country, because rivers are the lifeblood of Bangladesh," aiming to foster river-consciousness and raise awareness among people.
